Titting is a municipality  in the district of Eichstätt in Bavaria in Germany. It is home to Brauerei Gutmann, which was founded in 1707.

Mayors
1996–2014 Martin Heiß (CSU)
since 2014: Andreas Brigl (CSU)

References

Eichstätt (district)